La honra de vivir (English: The Glory of Living) is a Mexican telenovela produced by Televisa and broadcast by Telesistema Mexicano in 1961.

Cast 
 Guillermo Zetina
 Elsa Cárdenas
 Pilar Sen
 Freddy Fernández
 Alejandro Ciangherotti

References

External links 

Mexican telenovelas
1961 telenovelas
Televisa telenovelas
1961 Mexican television series debuts
1961 Mexican television series endings
Spanish-language telenovelas